Southern Nevada Correctional Center was a medium-security men's prison in Jean, Clark County, Nevada (about 30 miles south of Las Vegas), owned and operated by the Nevada Department of Corrections.  The facility has been closed since 2008.

First opened in 1978, the facility was closed in 2000, then re-opened for two years to house inmates under 25 years of age.  As late as 2015, Nevada legislators raised the possibility of reopening it, if only to illustrate a political point.

SNCC should not be confused with the Southern Desert Correctional Center, also run by the state for state inmates, and the Nevada Southern Detention Center, a private prison run by Corrections Corporation of America

History 
The original 1978 facility housed prisoners sentenced for DUI or similar crimes.  Later a psychiatric center was established in Desert Hall, which housed a medium security psychological treatment facility for inmates deemed to be too impaired to live among the general population.  In the 1980s the prison contained mostly sex offenders, offenders who had been on protective custody in other prisons in the state and "lifers" who had been in custody for many years with no problems.

In 2006 the center installed the first in the nation electronic tracking system for all prisoners.

Description
The cell blocks are situated alongside the left, right, and rear sides of a central campus and, from the outside, resemble condominiums or apartments constructed in free-standing modules. Each housing unit consists of two "wings".  Each wing has a central rotunda with two tiers of cells.  The cells are fitted for two people with a bunk bed, sink and toilet.  There are no bars.  Each cell has a door with a small window in it.

There are no shrubs, trees, or grass inside the compound, which is double fenced. The interior fence, a heavy-duty chain-link fence, is approximately 20 feet tall, curves inward near the top, and is topped with a roll of razor wire. The outside fence is also a heavy-duty chain-link fence. It is taller than the interior fence, also curves inward near its top, and it is equipped with two rolls of razor-wire along its top. Another roll of razor wire is attached along the bottom of the exterior fence, making even an approach to the fence difficult, if not impossible. Instead of grass, shrubs, and trees, the compound inside the double fence contains raked gravel which is tan in color.

Sidewalks, which are identified by an alphanumeric code at their heads, lead to the modules and the cafeteria. At the south end of the compound is the gym, and the north end contains the chapel, school and administrative building and visiting center.(Ref. - former inmate 1984–1991)

In popular culture
 In the 2006 Sci Fi Channel miniseries The Lost Room, the protagonist visits the prison in search of his missing daughter.
 In the 2010 video game Fallout: New Vegas, one of the locations in-game is a prison called the "NCR Correctional Facility" located in the same geographical location in Jean, Nevada, which is based on the Southern Nevada Correctional Facility.

References 

Buildings and structures in Clark County, Nevada
Prisons in Nevada
Jean, Nevada
Residential buildings in the Las Vegas metropolitan area
1978 establishments in Nevada
2008 disestablishments in Nevada